John Thomas Neidert (born June 18, 1946) is a former American football linebacker who played three seasons with the Cincinnati Bengals, New York Jets and Chicago Bears. He was drafted by the Bengals in the sixth round of the 1968 NFL Draft. Neidert played college football at University of Louisville and attended Archbishop Hoban High School in Akron, Ohio. He was a member of the New York Jets team that won Super Bowl III.

References

External links
Just Sports Stats
Fanbase profile

Living people
1946 births
Players of American football from Akron, Ohio
American football linebackers
Louisville Cardinals football players
Cincinnati Bengals players
New York Jets players
Chicago Bears players